Gracelyn Smallwood  (born 1951) is a professor of nursing and midwifery at Central Queensland University. She is an Aboriginal Australian of Biri descent.

Early life 
Smallwood was born in 1951 in Townsville, Queensland, of Biri descent.

Nursing career 
Smallwood trained in general nursing, midwifery and psychiatric nursing at the Townsville Hospital.

She was the first Indigenous Australian to be awarded a Masters of Science in public health from James Cook University.

In 2016, she was appointed Professor of Nursing and Midwifery at Central Queensland University.

Other roles
Smallwood has been an advocate for the rights of Aboriginal and Torres Strait Islander people since 1968.

On 15 January 2020, it was announced that Smallwood would be one of the members of the National Co-design Group of the Indigenous voice to government.

Honours
Awards and honours include:
Queensland Aboriginal of the Year in 1986
Henry Kemp Memorial Award at the International Society for Prevention of Child Abuse and Neglect in 1994
Deadly Award for Outstanding Lifetime Achievement in Indigenous Health in 2007
NAIDOC Person of the Year in 2014
Member of the Order of Australia in 1992, for her service to Aboriginal Health and Welfare, and to public health, particularly HIV/AIDS.

Published works

References

External links 

Indigenous Australian academics
Australian women academics
Living people
1951 births
Indigenous Australian women academics
People from Townsville
Academic staff of Central Queensland University
James Cook University alumni

Indigenous Australian scientists
Australian nurses
Australian women scientists